Joe Balsamo is an Italian-American football manager. He is currently the head coach for the Brooklyn Knights' PDL squad.

Biography

Early life and education
Giuseppe (Joe) Balsamo was born in Switzerland and grew up in Palermo, Sicily.

Football career
Joe became a professional player at the Primavera level at age 16, and came to the United States at 17 to play in the North American Soccer League. He returned to Italy to play in the Italian Serie C for coach Giovanni Seghedoni. In 1989, Joe returned to the United States and settled in Bensonhurst, Brooklyn.

Joe’s coaching accomplishments include many championships and titles at various age levels, including, in 2002, the championship of the Enzo Ferrari Cup in Italy, where his side defeated the squads of Juventus and Modena. He also coached the United States representative team at the 2003 Danone Cup in Paris.

Joe now is the president and head coach of F.A. Euro. Joe is the current coach of F.A. Euro's Professional Development League team (PDL).

Family life
Joe and his wife, Lisa, have two boys, Marco and Vincent. Marco is a college student pursuing film and Vincent who is in junior high school. They live happily in Brooklyn, NY.

References

External links
Brooklyn Knights - Giuseppe (Joe) Balsamo

Year of birth missing (living people)
Living people
American soccer coaches
Italian emigrants to the United States